Andreea Verdes (born 18 October 2000) is a Romanian individual rhythmic gymnast.

Career
She was introduced to rhythmic gymnastics by her grandparents at the age of 5.

In 2021, she tried to win an Olympic spot in Tokyo for Romania. She placed 12th in All-around 2021 World Cup Baku and was on second place in qualifying before the last World Cup. She competed at the 2021 European Championships in Varna, Bulgaria, and finished on 14th place in All-around. Therefore, she lost her last chance of qualifying to the 2020 Summer Olympics, being defeated by Hungarian Fanni Pigniczki.

On October 27 to 31, she competed at the 2021 World Championships in Kitakyushu, Japan, and ended on 15th place in All-around Qualifications. In All-around Final, she made some mistakes and finished 18th.

Personal life
She is studying physical education at Alexandru Ioan Cuza University in Iași, Romania.

Routine music information

References

External links 
 
 

2000 births
Living people
Romanian rhythmic gymnasts
Sportspeople from Iași